Tindegga Ridge is a rock ridge immediately southwest of Ytstenut Peak, at the northeast end of the Borg Massif in Queen Maud Land. Mapped by Norwegian cartographers from surveys and air photos by Norwegian-British-Swedish Antarctic Expedition (NBSAE) (1949–52) and air photos by the Norwegian expedition (1958–59) and named Tindegga (the summit ridge).

Ridges of Queen Maud Land
Princess Martha Coast